is a junction passenger railway station located in the city of Tachikawa, Tokyo, Japan, operated by the East Japan Railway Company (JR East).

Lines 
Tachikawa Station is served by the Chūō Main Line, and is located 37.1 kilometers from the starting point of the line at Tokyo Station. It is also a terminus for both the  Ōme Line and Nambu Lines. Although the Itsukaichi Line does not reach Tachikawa, a few trains on that line continue along the Ome Line tracks to serve this station.

Station layout 
This station consists of four ground-level island platforms serving eight tracks, with an elevated station building located above the platforms. The station has a "Midori no Madoguchi" staffed ticket office. Tachikawa-Minami Station and Tachikawa-Kita Station on the Tama Toshi Monorail Line flank Tachikawa Station, and are connected to it by decks. The Lumine department store occupies the upper floors of the station building.

Platforms

Track layout

History
The Kōbu Railway, which later became the Chūō Main Line, opened the station on April 11, 1889. The Ōme Railway (presently the Ōme Line) and the Nambu Railway (presently the Nambu Line) were connected to the station on November 19, 1894, and December 11, 1929, respectively.

The Itsukaichi Line was also connected to the station from July 13, 1930, to October 11, 1944, via a separate track between Tachikawa and Haijima, which was closed following the integration of the operation of the Ōme and Itsukaichi lines under the Japanese Government Railways in April 1944.

With the privatization of Japanese National Railways (JNR) on April 1, 1987, the station came under the control of JR East.

Passenger statistics
In fiscal 2019, the station was used by an average of 166,636 passengers daily (boarding passengers only), making it the 16th busiest station in the JR East network. The passenger figures for previous years are as shown below.

See also

 List of railway stations in Japan

References

External links

Station information (JR East) 

Railway stations in Japan opened in 1889
Chūō Main Line
Ōme Line
Nambu Line
Stations of East Japan Railway Company
Railway stations in Tokyo
Tachikawa, Tokyo